ACARM (Alert Correlation, Assessment and Reaction Module) is an open source intrusion detection system. It was developed as a part of POSITIF project between 2004 and 2007. It was written as a practical proof of concept, presented in the article.

Filters architecture 
The following image shows chain-like architecture for filters, as used in the system.

Each alert enters each filter, stays there for a specified amount of time and proceeds further in chain. Main issue with such an approach is that alter can be reported only after its processing is done, which in turn takes at least few minutes.

Notes 
Project is no longer maintained. It has been replaced with new, plug-in-based ACARM-ng.

See also 

 ACARM-ng
 Intrusion detection system (IDS)
 Prelude Hybrid IDS
 BEEP

References

Free software programmed in Java (programming language)
Java (programming language) software